Ana Cristina César (June 2, 1952 – October 29, 1983) was a poet, literary critic and translator from Rio de Janeiro. She came from a middle-class Protestant background and was usually known as "Ana C." She had written since childhood and developed a strong interest in English literature. She spent some time in England in 1968 and, on returning to Brazil, she became a published author of note. The 1970s and early 1980s were the peak of her poetic career.

She is considered one of the main names of the mimeograph generation, also known as the marginal poetry of the 1970s.

She returned to England in 1983. One of the authors she admired was Sylvia Plath. She shared some commonalities with her in temperament and fate. She died in 1983 by jumping out of a window at her parents´ apartment, in Rio de Janeiro.

Principal works

Poetry
 A Teus Pés [At Your Feet]
 Inéditos e Dispersos [Inedited and Dispersed]
 Novas Seletas [New Anthology] (posthumous, put out by Armando Freitas Filho)

Criticism
 Crítica e Tradução [Criticism and Translation]

References

External links
 
 A Portuguese language poetry journal

1952 births
1983 suicides
Brazilian translators
Suicides by jumping in Brazil
Translators to Portuguese
20th-century translators
20th-century Brazilian poets
Brazilian women poets
20th-century Brazilian women writers